The 2021 Arnold Palmer Cup was a team golf competition held from June 11–13, 2021 at  Rich Harvest Farms, Sugar Grove, Illinois. It was the 25th time the event had been contested and the fourth under the new format in which women golfers played in addition to men, and the United States played an international team. The United States team won the match 33–27.

Format
The contest was played over three days. On Friday, there were 12 mixed four-ball matches. On Saturday there were 24 foursomes matches, 12 in the morning, six all-women matches and six all-men matches, and 12 mixed matches in the afternoon. 24 singles matches were played on Sunday. In all, 60 matches were played.

Each of the 60 matches was worth one point in the larger team competition. If a match was all square after the 18th hole, each side earned half a point toward their team total. The team that accumulated at least 30½ points won the competition.

Teams
Selection was by a committee, except for the four coaches picks, one man and woman on each team. Six committee selections for each team were announced in March 2021 with the remaining players announced in early May. The head coaches were announced in September 2020 with the assistant coaches selected in March 2021.

Friday's mixed fourball matches

Saturday's matches

Morning foursomes matches

Afternoon mixed foursomes matches

Sunday's singles matches

Michael Carter award
The Michael Carter Award winners were Sam Bennett and Jin Bo.

References

External links
Arnold Palmer Cup official site

Arnold Palmer Cup
Golf in Illinois
Arnold Palmer Cup
Arnold Palmer Cup
Arnold Palmer Cup
Arnold Palmer Cup